Richard Ames is a Canadian Progressive Conservative politician who has represented Carleton-York in the Legislative Assembly of New Brunswick since 2020.

References 

Living people
Progressive Conservative Party of New Brunswick MLAs
21st-century Canadian politicians
Year of birth missing (living people)